Li Qiang (born 4 January 1989) is a Chinese male sprint canoeist who competed since the late 2000s.

He won a silver medal in the C-1 500 m event at the 2010 ICF Canoe Sprint World Championships in Poznań and the C-1 200 m at the 2015 ICF Canoe Sprint World Championships.

Li also finished sixth in the C-1 500 m event at the 2008 Summer Olympics in Beijing.  At the 2012 Summer Olympics, he finished in 15th in the C-1 200 m and 8th in the C-2 1000 m with Huang Maoxing.

At 2014 Asian Games he won a gold medal in the men's C-1 200 m event.

At the 2016 Olympics, he finished 7th in the C-1 200 m.

References

External links

1989 births
Living people
People from Fushun
Canoeists from Liaoning
Chinese male canoeists
Olympic canoeists of China
Canoeists at the 2008 Summer Olympics
Canoeists at the 2012 Summer Olympics
Canoeists at the 2016 Summer Olympics
Asian Games gold medalists for China
Asian Games medalists in canoeing
Canoeists at the 2010 Asian Games
Canoeists at the 2014 Asian Games
Canoeists at the 2018 Asian Games
ICF Canoe Sprint World Championships medalists in Canadian
Medalists at the 2010 Asian Games
Medalists at the 2014 Asian Games
Medalists at the 2018 Asian Games